The Pearl Bailey Show is an American variety show that aired on ABC Saturdays 8:30–9:30 P.M. from January 1971 to May 1971. A Cooper-Finkel Company production in association with the Pearl Bailey Production Corporation, the show starred veteran entertainer Pearl Bailey.

Overview 
Pearl Bailey had a decades long successful career as a singer and stage and film actress by the time she was given her her own variety show in 1971. Bailey's husband, drummer Louis Bellson, was the conductor of the Orchestra for the show. The Robert Sidney Dancers and the Allan Davies Singers were regulars, performing a variety of musical entertainment.

The Pearl Bailey Show featured an array of guest performances by prominent entertainers, including Lucille Ball, Bing Crosby, Louis Armstrong, B.B. King, The Supremes, Tony Bennett, Ike & Tina Turner, and Liberace. "She got everybody she wanted. Nobody would turn her down," recalled the show's producer Bob Finkel. Despite the array of guests, the show was cancelled in less than four months, Finkel suggests due to Bailey "harassing" the executives at ABC with "suggestions and complaints."

Episodes

References 

American Broadcasting Company original programming
1970s American music television series
English-language television shows
1971 American television series debuts
1971 American television series endings
1970s American variety television series